Saint Mark's Body Brought to Venice, The Abduction of the Body of Saint Mark  or Translation of the Body of Saint Mark is a painting by Tintoretto depicting the translatio, or transfer of Saint Mark's relics from Alexandria to Venice. It was produced between 1562 and 1566 as part of a series of works on Saint Mark for the Sala Capitolare of the Scuola Grande di San Marco - the others are Miracle of the Slave, Saint Mark Saving a Saracen from Shipwreck and Finding of the Body of Saint Mark. It is now held in the Gallerie dell'Accademia in Venice.

The painting is notable for its striking, deep perspective background lines. The colours are darker in the near subjects, while the figures in the background are white, nearly transparent. The strange red sky is roiling with ominous clouds, riven with a thunderbolt, affording the painting a heavy, dynamic atmosphere. Tintoretto himself is portrayed within the work as the bearded man beside the camel.

References

Sources
Gillo Dorfles, Stefania Buganza e Jacopo Stoppa, Arti visive. Dal Quattrocento all'Impressionismo, Atlas, 2001

External links

1560s paintings
Paintings by Tintoretto
Paintings in the Gallerie dell'Accademia
Religious paintings
Christian art about death
Paintings about death
Venice in art
Paintings depicting Mark the Evangelist
Paintings of Venice